Ralf Hauptmann (born 20 September 1968) is a German former footballer.

Club career 
He played 265 top-flight matches in East and unified Germany (10 goals).

International career 
Hauptmann won four caps for East Germany.

Personal life
His son, Niklas, currently plays for Dynamo Dresden, while his son Marius plays for FSV Zwickau.

References

External links
 
 
 
 

1968 births
Living people
People from Eberswalde
German footballers
East German footballers
East Germany international footballers
Association football midfielders
Dynamo Dresden players
1. FC Köln players
Chemnitzer FC players
Bundesliga players
2. Bundesliga players
DDR-Oberliga players
Footballers from Brandenburg